For other automobile manufacturing related lists, see See also''
   
This is a list of current automotive parts suppliers, arranged in alphabetical order. The year of foundation is shown in brackets.

A 

Autobacs Seven (1947)
Automotive Lighting (1999)
Axon (2005)

B 

BBS (1970)
Bilstein (1873)
Bosch (1886)

C 

Comau (1973)

D 

Dinan (1979)

E 

Factory Five (1995)

H 

Hoesch (1871)
HKS (1973)

I 

Impul (1980)
Intrepid (1991)
ISA (1980)

K 

Katech (1977)

L 

Laboratorio
Locust
Loremo (2000)

M 

Magna (1957)
Magneti Marelli (1919)
Mamerow (1982)
Mazel(1987)
Mecachrome (1937)
Mobsteel
Mopar (1937)
Motrio (1998)
Mr. Norm's (1948)
Multimatic (1984)

N 

nanoFlowcell (2013)
Napier (1990)
Novitec (1989)

O 

OnlineMetals.com (1998)

R 

Rieter (1795)

P 

Paxton (1937)

T 

ThyssenKrupp (1999)

See also

List of automobile manufacturers
List of automobile marques
List of current automobile manufacturers by country
Timeline of motor vehicle brands
Automotive industry in the United Kingdom
List of car manufacturers of the United Kingdom
List of Asian automobile manufacturers
List of Eastern European automobiles
List of Western European automobile manufacturers

References

 Current (alphabetical)
 Current (alphabetical)